Hadleigh Country Park is a country park in Hadleigh, Essex, England.

History
The park was formerly called Hadleigh Castle Country Park. The park was conceived in the 1930s but not created until the 1970s. Hadleigh Castle is adjacent but separate and managed by English Heritage.

Facilities
The park is home to an Iron Age roundhouse, mountain biking trails, horse riding, a reservoir, conservation area, walking routes, a visitor centre and natural habitats.

Conservation area
The park incorporates a wetland conservation area and salt marsh that is home to dragonflies.

Events
The park was the venue for mountain biking in the 2012 Summer Olympics. There is also stargazing.

References

Venues of the 2012 Summer Olympics
Parks and open spaces in Essex